Justice Fairchild may refer to:

Edward T. Fairchild (judge), associate justice of the Wisconsin Supreme Court
Hulbert F. Fairchild, associate justice of the Arkansas Supreme Court
Thomas E. Fairchild, associate justice of the Wisconsin Supreme Court